"The Main Event/Fight" is a 1979 medley recorded by Barbra Streisand. The song is the title track and first and only single issued from the LP, The Main Event.  The album is the soundtrack for the movie, The Main Event starring Streisand and Ryan O'Neal.  The song became the first of two major disco-styled hits for Streisand, the other being "No More Tears (Enough Is Enough)," a duet with Donna Summer later the same year.

Record World said that it "exhibits Barbra's stylish vocals adorning a punchy disco beat."

"The Main Event/Fight" spent four weeks at number three on the U.S. Billboard Hot 100. In Canada it reached number five.  It was also a major Adult Contemporary hit, reaching number two and number one in those nations, respectively.  The song did not chart outside North America and was largely left out of recurrent rotation, having among the highest amount of drop-off in radio airplay of the hits of 1979 (Streisand's other singles of that year also fared poorly in maintaining airplay).

Chart performance

Weekly charts

Year-end charts

Certifications

References

External links
  

1979 singles
Barbra Streisand songs
Columbia Records singles
1979 songs
Songs written for films
Songs written by Paul Jabara
Songs written by Bruce Roberts (singer)
Music medleys